Keble is both a surname and a given name. Notable people with the name include:

 John Keble (1792–1866), English churchman and founder of the Oxford Movement
 Richard Keble (fl. 1650), judge, and a supporter of the Parliamentarian cause during the English Civil War 
 Bernard Keble Sandwell (1876–1940), Canadian newspaper editor
 Edward Keble Chatterton (1878–1944), English writer
 Keble Howard, pen name of John Keble Bell, (1875–1928), English writer and journalist
 William Keble Martin (1877–1969), British botanist

Keble College is one of the constituent colleges of Oxford University named after John Keble.

See also
 Keble College, Oxford, one of the constituent colleges of the University of Oxford
 Keble Road, a street in Oxford
 Keble School, a preparatory school